Ramón Enríquez Rodríguez (born 19 April 2001), simply known as Ramón, is a Spanish footballer who plays for Málaga CF as an attacking midfielder.

Club career
Ramón was born in Órgiva, Granada, Andalusia, and joined Málaga CF's youth setup in 2013, from CD Ciudad de Granada. He made his senior debut with the reserves on 7 April 2019, coming on as a late substitute for Juan Cruz in a 3–0 Segunda División B home defeat of Sevilla Atlético.

On 17 April 2019, Ramón renewed his contract until 2022. He made his first team debut on 17 August, coming on as a late substitute for fellow youth graduate Hugo Vallejo in a 1–0 away win against Racing de Santander.

References

External links
 
 
 

2001 births
Living people
Sportspeople from the Province of Granada
Spanish footballers
Footballers from Andalusia
Association football midfielders
Segunda División players
Segunda División B players
Tercera División players
Atlético Malagueño players
Málaga CF players
Spain youth international footballers